Bylina is an airline based in Bykovo Airport, Russia. It was established in 2003 and is a Russian executive private and business charter operator.

Destinations

Anapa - Anapa Airport
Chelyabinsk - Chelyabinsk Airport
Gelendzhik - Gelendzhik Airport
Ivanovo - Ivanovo Yuzhny Airport
Krasnodar - Pashkovsky Airport
Perm - Bolshoye Savino Airport
Simferopol - Simferopol International Airport
Ulyanovsk - Ulyanovsk Baratayevka Airport

Fleet

The Bylina fleet included the following aircraft (as June 2014):

5 Tupolev Tu-134 (RA-65944, RA-65805, RA-65574, RA-65097, RA-65906)
3 Yakovlev Yak-40 (RA-87334, RA-88263, RA-21506)

External links
 Bylina official website

References

Defunct airlines of Russia
Companies based in Moscow
Airlines established in 2003